Champion Christian College is a private Christian college in Hot Springs, Arkansas.

History
Champion Christian College was originally founded in 2005 as Champion Baptist College. After operating as a bible college for 5 years, the college's board of trustees changed the institution's name and instituted steps to attain accreditation from the Transnational Association of Colleges and Schools. Champion Christian College gained candidacy status in 2017 and full accreditation two years later.

Academics
The college offers an Associate of Science and the Bachelor in Professional Studies degrees, certified by the Arkansas Division of Higher Education. It also offers a Bachelor of Arts in Church Ministries degree.

Athletics
The college's athletic program is known as the Champion Christian Tigers and fields a men's and women's basketball team and volleyball teams as an independent member of the Association of Christian College Athletics (ACCA).

On December 30, 2013, the Tigers lost 116–12 to Southern University. To start this game, Southern went on a 44–0 run, which is an all-division NCAA record for the most points scored by one team to start a game.

On March 13, 2021, the Lady Tigers won 87-81 versus five-time defending champion Arlington Baptist University to win the 2021 NCCAA DII National Championship in women's basketball.

References

External links

Seminaries and theological colleges in Arkansas
Education in Garland County, Arkansas
Buildings and structures in Hot Springs, Arkansas
Educational institutions established in 2005
2005 establishments in Arkansas
Transnational Association of Christian Colleges and Schools